Biadoliny Szlacheckie  is a village in the administrative district of Gmina Dębno, within Brzesko County, Lesser Poland Voivodeship, in southern Poland.

There is a railway station in the village.

References

Biadoliny Szlacheckie